Simon Taylor (born 18 August 1982) is a former Australian rules football player who played with the Hawthorn Football Club in Australian Football League. A ruckman, Taylor was selected by Hawthorn with pick 53 in the 2004 national draft.

Taylor prior to playing for the Box Hill Hawks played for the Tasmanian Devils Football Club in the VFL

After sharing the ruck responsibilities with Robert Campbell for most of the 2007 and 2008 seasons, he was overlooked for the 2008 AFL Grand Final, with the backup ruck position being taken by Brent Renouf.  In 2009, he played 18 games, more than Campbell or Renouf, but was not as effective as earlier years, leading the Hawks to look to recruit a ruckman to replace Campbell who retired due to injury.

Taylor broke his ankle during a pre-season game against North Melbourne, he missed most of the 2010 season.

Because of persistent niggling injuries and never really demonstrating the qualities that were expected of him through his career, he was delisted from the club on 19 October 2010, along with fellow ruckman Wayde Skipper

Statistics

|- style=background:#EAEAEA
| 2005 ||  || 43
| 17 || 8 || 4 || 39 || 63 || 102 || 30 || 20 || 135 || 0.5 || 0.2 || 2.3 || 3.7 || 6.0 || 1.8 || 1.2 || 7.9 || 0
|-
| 2006 ||  || 13
| 7 || 0 || 1 || 14 || 27 || 41 || 12 || 5 || 69 || 0.0 || 0.1 || 2.0 || 3.9 || 5.9 || 1.7 || 0.7 || 9.9 || 0
|- style=background:#EAEAEA
| 2007 ||  || 13
| 24 || 4 || 2 || 83 || 126 || 209 || 71 || 58 || 336 || 0.2 || 0.1 || 3.5 || 5.3 || 8.7 || 3.0 || 2.4 || 14.0 || 0
|-
| 2008 ||  || 13
| 18 || 3 || 0 || 45 || 120 || 165 || 43 || 35 || 270 || 0.2 || 0.0 || 2.5 || 6.7 || 9.2 || 2.4 || 1.9 || 15.0 || 0
|- style=background:#EAEAEA
| 2009 ||  || 13
| 18 || 1 || 2 || 41 || 118 || 159 || 43 || 48 || 419 || 0.1 || 0.1 || 2.3 || 6.6 || 8.8 || 2.4 || 2.7 || 23.3 || 0
|-
| 2010 ||  || 13
| 1 || 0 || 0 || 1 || 1 || 2 || 0 || 1 || 15 || 0.0 || 0.0 || 1.0 || 1.0 || 2.0 || 0.0 || 1.0 || 15.0 || 0
|- class="sortbottom"
! colspan=3| Career
! 85 !! 16 !! 9 !! 223 !! 455 !! 678 !! 223 !! 167 !! 1244 !! 0.2 !! 0.1 !! 2.6 !! 5.4 !! 8.0 !! 2.6 !! 2.0 !! 14.6 !! 0
|}

References

External links

 
 

1982 births
Living people
Australian rules footballers from Victoria (Australia)
Hawthorn Football Club players
Box Hill Football Club players
Tasmanian Devils Football Club players